Hugh Gordon McEwen (2 April 1877 – 7 March 1914) was an Australian rules footballer who played for the Fitzroy Football Club in the Victorian Football League (VFL).

McEwen, who began at Fitzroy in their debut VFL season, was a defender from Hamilton. He played as a back pocket in his club's 1899 premiership side and was in the same position when they lost the 1900 Grand Final to Melbourne.

References

Holmesby, Russell and Main, Jim (2007). The Encyclopedia of AFL Footballers. 7th ed. Melbourne: Bas Publishing.
 

1877 births
1914 deaths
Australian rules footballers from Victoria (Australia)
Fitzroy Football Club players
Fitzroy Football Club Premiership players
One-time VFL/AFL Premiership players